Idol: Jakten på en superstjerne 2005 was the third season of Idol Norway based on the British singing competition Pop Idol. It premiered one year after the second season and was aired in the first half of 2005.
Ingrid Gjessing was replaced by Kåre Magnus Bergh and with Jan Fredrik Karlsen's departure the entire judging panel was changed with Tone-Lise Skagefoss becoming the new jury foreperson.
It was also the first time that two girls faced off each other in the final 2 showdown making Jorun Stiansen the first female winner over Tone Damli Aaberge.
Aaberge would attempt to represent Norway in the Eurovision Song Contest in 2009 where she ended up being the runner-up, this time to Alexander Rybak who later went on to win the contest.
Ironically Rybak has also been a contestant on Idol 2005 and in the same semifinal group as Aaberge. However while Aaberge went on winning her group, Rybak did not even manage to reach the top 5 and therefore missed out a spot in the group of final 12.
Second runner-up Alejandro Fuentes was able to top VG-lista (Norwegian Single Charts) three times between 2005 and 2007. One if these no. 1 Hits was a collaboration with Askil Holm, Espen Lind and Kurt Nilsen (winner of season one). The quartet also went on tour under the name The New Guitar Buddies.

Finals

Finalists
(ages stated at time of contest)

Elimination Chart

Live show details

Heat 1 (February 11, 2005)

Heat 2 (February 16, 2005)

Heat 3 (February 18, 2005)

Heat 4 (February 23, 2005)

Heat 5 (February 25, 2005)

Live Show 1 (March 4, 2005)
Theme: Your Idol

Live Show 2 (March 11, 2005)
Theme: Made in Norway

Live Show 3 (March 18, 2005)
Theme: Soul & R&B

Live Show 4 (April 1, 2005)
Theme: Movie Songs

Live Show 5 (April 8, 2005)
Theme: Your Birth Year

Live Show 6 (April 15, 2005)
Theme: Country

Live Show 7 (April 22, 2005)
Theme: Beatles

Live Show 8 (April 29, 2005)
Theme: Big Band

Live Show 9 (May 6, 2005)
Theme: Duets

Live Show 10: Semi-final (May 13, 2005)
Theme: Judge's Choice

Live final (May 20, 2005)

References

External links
 Profiles of the top 12 finalists

Season 03
2005 Norwegian television seasons